Ekimchan is an urban locality (a work settlement) and the administrative center of Selemdzhinsky District of Amur Oblast, Russia, located on the right bank of the Selemdzha River. Population:

Transportation
A local road leads west to Koboldo and Stoyba.

Ekimchan is served by the Ekimchan Airport.

Climate
Ekimchan has a subarctic climate (Köppen climate classification Dwc) with dry and bitterly cold winters and warm, wet summers.

References

Notes

Sources

Urban-type settlements in Amur Oblast